Andrea Pierbenedetti (1568–1634) was a Roman Catholic prelate who served as Bishop of Venosa (1611–1634).

Biography
Andrea Pierbenedetti was born in Camerino, Italy in 1568.
On 14 March 1611, he was appointed during the papacy of Pope Paul V as Bishop of Venosa.
On 20 March 1611, he was consecrated bishop by Giovanni Garzia Mellini, Cardinal-Priest of Santi Quattro Coronati, with Antonio Seneca, Bishop of Anagni, and Pietro Bastoni, Bishop of Umbriatico, serving as co-consecrators. 
He served as Bishop of Venosa until his death in 1634.

References

External links and additional sources
 (for Chronology of Bishops) 
 (for Chronology of Bishops) 

17th-century Italian Roman Catholic bishops
Bishops appointed by Pope Paul V
1568 births
1634 deaths